Mark Rattelle (born March 1, 1983) is an American professional wrestler and manager. He currently works for the American promotion All Elite Wrestling (AEW) under the ring name "Smart" Mark Sterling.

Professional wrestling career 
Rattelle was trained by Kevin Landry, Brian Myers, and Pat Buck at the Create-A-Pro Academy. He made his debut for All Elite Wrestling during the August 22, 2020 episode of Dynamite, where he portrayed a lawyer supporting MJF. He was defeated in a match against Jon Moxley on September 2, 2020.

On May 28, 2021, he offered his services to Jade Cargill and her stable 'The Baddies' with him regularly accompanying Cargill to the ring until being replaced by Stokely Hathaway in May 2022. He became aligned with Tony Nese upon his debut for the company in December 2021. At the Buy in for Double or Nothing (2022), he teamed with Nese in a losing effort against Danhausen and Hook. On July 27, 2022 at Fight for the Fallen, he again teamed with Nese, losing to Swerve Strickland and Keith Lee.

Personal 
Rattelle is close friends with Matt Cardona and Brian Myers, and produces the Major Wrestling Figure Podcast alongside them.

Championships and accomplishments 

 Blitzkrieg! Pro
 B!P Bedlam Championship (1 time)
 Create A Pro Wrestling
 CAP Tag Team Championship (2 times) – with Swoggle and Brian Myers
 CAP Championship (1 time)
 Pioneer Valley Promotions
 PVP Women's Championship (1 time)

References

External links 

 

1983 births
21st-century professional wrestlers
American male professional wrestlers
All Elite Wrestling personnel
Living people
People from Boston
Professional wrestlers from Massachusetts